Ëmëhntëhtt-Ré is the tenth studio album by French rock band Magma. It was released on 20 October 2009. Parts of it have been played live since 1975 and can be found on various albums as extracts or live versions.

Included with the CD is a making-of DVD called "Phases".

Background
Like the band's previous release, K.A (Köhntarkösz Anteria), Ëmëhntëhtt-Ré is formed of material Magma wrote and performed live during the mid 1970s to 1980. Unlike Köhntarkösz Anteria however, where the album consisted entirely of unreleased material, Ëmëhntëhtt-Ré is formed of both unreleased and released material from that era, the first half of the album serving as a large-scale rerecording: 

 The song "Ëmëhntëhtt-Ré I" combines "Ëmëhntëht-Rê (Announcement)" from the album Live/Hhaï (1975) and "Rindë (Eastern Song)" from the album Attahk (1978).
 The song "Ëmëhntëhtt-Ré II" combines "Ëmëhntëht-Rê (Extrait n' deux)" (released on the 1988 CD of Üdü Ẁüdü), "Hhaï" from the album Live/Hhaï (1975), and "Zombies (Ghost Dance)" from Üdü Ẁüdü.

The repurposing of material from other albums is because the album was always meant to consist of these songs, and they were split over numerous different albums at the time when it was clear it would not be released in its intended format. 

The album belongs to a trilogy of three comprising K.A (Köhntarkösz Anteria), Köhntarkösz, and Ëmëhntëhtt-Ré, called the Köhntarkösz Trilogy. The album's content tells the story of Ëmëhntëhtt-Ré, murdered in antiquity. The figure from the previous two albums, Köhntarkösz, finds his tomb and has a grand, vivid vision of Ëmëhntëhtt-Ré's life, who eventually takes over his body and becomes anew, fulfilling the prophecy and ending the trilogy's story.

Track listing

Personnel
Magma
 Christian Vander – drums, vocals, piano, Fender Rhodes, keyboard, percussion
 Stella Vander – vocals, percussion
 Isabelle Feuillebois – vocals
 Hervé Aknin – vocals
 Benoît Alziary – vibraphone
 James MacGaw – guitar
 Bruno Ruder – Fender Rhodes
 Philippe Bussonnet – bass, piccolo bass

With:
 Claude Lamamy – vocals
 Marcus Linon – vocals
 Pierre-Michel Sivadier – vocals
 Himiko Paganotti – vocals
 Antoine Paganotti – vocals
 Emmanuel Borghi – piano

References

External links 
 Ëmëhntëhtt-Ré at www.seventhrecords.com

Magma (band) albums
2009 albums